Storrie is a surname. Notable people with the surname include:

Jim Storrie (1940–2014), Scottish footballer and manager
Peter Storrie (born 1952), English football executive
Sandy Storrie (born 1962), British Army general
William Storrie (died 1900), Australian businessman and politician